Oleg Aleksandrovich Anisimov is a Russian climate scientist. Doctor of Science in Geography and Professor of Physical Geography at the State Hydrological Institute (SHI), part of the Federal Service for Hydrometeorology and Environmental Monitoring of Russia (Roshydromet) in Saint Petersburg. An expert on the impact of climate change on the Arctic region, he has acted as a lead author for the Intergovernmental Panel on Climate Change (IPCC), which received the 2007 Nobel Peace Prize.

Life
Anisimov was the coordinating lead author of the Polar regions chapters in the Third (2001), Fourth (2007) and Fifth IPCC assessment reports. He was also lead author for the Arctic Climate Impact Assessment (ACIA) and Snow, Water, Ice and Permafrost in the Arctic (SWIPA).

In 2015, Anisimov warned that Arctic amplification was causing global warming in Yakutia, Russia's coldest region, to take place at twice the global rate:

In December 2018, he addressed the 8th Arctic: Today and the Future, an international forum of Arctic researchers, reporting on changes in the cryolithic zone of the Arctic.

After the 2022 Russian invasion of Ukraine, Anisimov apologised for his country's actions to a virtual meeting of more than 200 delegates from IPCC member countries, saying he had 'huge praise' for Ukraine.

References

Year of birth missing (living people)
Living people
Russian climatologists
Arctic scientists
Russian activists against the 2022 Russian invasion of Ukraine